Dirk ter Haar FRSE FIP DSc (Oosterwolde, 19 April 1919 – Drachten, 3 September 2002) was an Anglo-Dutch physicist.

Life
Dirk ter Haar was born at Oosterwolde in the province Friesland in the north of the Netherlands on 19 April 1919.
He studied physics as an undergraduate at the University of Leiden. In 1946 he was a research fellow of Niels Bohr at the Institute for Theoretical Physics in Copenhagen (now the Niels Bohr Institute), and returned to Leiden in 1948 to obtain his PhD.  His supervisor was the renowned Hendrik Kramers and his PhD dissertation was on the origin of the Solar System. From 1947 to 1950 he was a visiting associate professor of physics at Purdue University.

In 1950 he obtained a post as professor of physics at the University of St. Andrews, and later became a British citizen. In 1952 he was elected a Fellow of the Royal Society of Edinburgh. His proposers were Jack Allen, David Jack, Daniel Edwin Rutherford and Edward Thomas Copson.

He became a Fellow and Senior Tutor of Magdalen College, Oxford and Reader in theoretical physics at the University of Oxford.

In 1966 Ter Haar became a corresponding member of the Royal Netherlands Academy of Arts and Sciences.

Many prominent scientists studied under Ter Haar, including Anthony Leggett, winner of the Nobel Prize in Physics in 2003, and Deng Jiaxian, one of the leading scientists and founders of Chinese nuclear weapons programs.

Dirk could read Russian, and played a prominent role in disseminating the works of Soviet physicists such as Landau and Kapitsa to the western world. He also translated the classic monograph Quantum Mechanics by Alexander Davydov into English.

He retired from his positions at Oxford in 1986, and died at Drachten in the northern Netherlands on 3 September 2002.

Family

In 1949 Dirk ter Haar married Christine Janet Lound and together they had two sons and a daughter. His daughter, Gail ter Haar, became a reader in physics as well, specializing in therapeutic ultrasound.

Works

He wrote numerous books on physics, such as Elements of Statistical Mechanics (1954). In addition, he wrote a book on Kramers and was a founding editor for Physics Letters (1962) (later Physics Letters A) and Physics Reports (1971). In 1984 the book Essays in Theoretical Physics in honour of Dirk ter Haar was published in honour of his work in statistical physics and quantum mechanics.

 D. ter Haar, Elements of Statistical Mechanics. London: Constable (1954). 2ed (1966) New York: Holt, Rinehart & Winston; 3ed (1995) Oxford: Butterworth-Heinemann
 D. ter Haar and H.N.S. Wergeland, Elements of Thermodynamics, Addison-Wesley, 1966
 D. ter Haar, Elements of Hamiltonian Mechanics, Pergamon Press, Oxford.
 D. ter Haar, The Old Quantum Theory, Pergamon Press, Oxford, 1967.
 D. ter Haar, "On the Origin of the Solar System", Annual Review of Astronomy and Astrophysics, Vol.5, Oxford, 1967:267-278, .
 D. ter Haar, Lectures on Selected Topics in Statistical Mechanics, Pergamon Press, Oxford, 1977.
 D. ter Haar, Master of Modern Physics. The Scientific Contributions of H. A. Kramers, Princeton University Press, 1998.

References

External links
 

1919 births
2002 deaths
20th-century Dutch physicists
20th-century British physicists
British people of Frisian descent
Leiden University alumni
Academics of the University of St Andrews
Fellows of the Royal Society of Edinburgh
Fellows of Magdalen College, Oxford
People from Ooststellingwerf
Members of the Royal Netherlands Academy of Arts and Sciences
Dutch emigrants to the United Kingdom
Dutch expatriates in the United States